Anja Kaesmacher, married name Anja Börner (born 3 September 1974) is a German operatic soprano, and voice teacher.

Life 
Born in Trier, Kaesmacher studied with Charlotte Lehmann and Ingeborg Hallstein at the Hochschule für Musik Würzburg and completed her studies in 2000 with the opera and concert exam. Since 2006, she has been taught by Monika Bürgener.
In the 1997/98 season she made her debut at the Mainfranken Theater Würzburg and was a member of the ensemble until 2008. In 2008, she decided to go freelance.

Guest appearances have taken her to the Staatstheater Wiesbaden, Staatstheater Braunschweig, Staatstheater Kassel, Meiningen Court Theatre, Stadttheater Bielefeld, Theater & Orchester Heidelberg, Theater Chemnitz etc. In the field of contemporary music, Kaesmacher has worked with conductors such as Jun Märkl, Matthias Pintscher, Rupert Huber and the orchestras of the SWR and the MDR together and contributes to festivals such as "Musica Viva" in Strasbourg and the festival "Eclat" in Stuttgart. Highlights include several world premieres of Manfred Trojahn's works, such as the lettera amorosa in 2007 on the occasion of the reopening of the Anna Amalia Library in Weimar, Che fie di me for two sopranos and orchestra, together with soprano Mojca Erdmann and the SWR Orchestra and in 2009 the performance of Ariosi for soprano, clarinet and orchestra with the Württemberg Philharmonic Orchestra conducted by Trojahn alongside clarinettist Sabine Meyer.

In addition to her artistic activities, she studied Catholic religion and philosophy at Justus Liebig University Giessen from 2010 to 2011 and passed the second Staatsexamen for the teaching profession at grammar schools in the subjects of music and ethics in May 2014. Kaesmacher has also held a teaching qualification for the subject Performing Arts since 2015 and works as a Studienrätin at the Freiherr-vom-Stein-Schule in Wetzlar.

Kaesmacher is married to the German tenor Heiko Börner and has two sons.

Repertoire

Awards 
 1993 Bundespreis Jugend musiziert in der Sparte Gesang.
 2002 war sie Stipendiatin des Richard Wagner Verbandes Würzburg.
 2003 Bayerischer Kunstförderpreis in der Sparte Darstellende Kunst.

References

External links 
 
 

German operatic sopranos
Voice teachers
1974 births
Living people
People from Trier